Miss Gladys Knight is the debut solo album by American singer Gladys Knight. It was released by Buddah Records in 1978 in the United States. Her only album with that label, it peaked at number 57 on the US Top R&B/Hip-Hop Albums chart.

Critical reception

Allmusic editor Alex Henderson wrote that Miss Gladys Knight "usually finds the singer walking a fine line between R&B and adult contemporary [...] Although pleasant and decent, Miss Gladys Knight isn't a masterpiece and isn't among her essential recordings. This album is only recommended to collectors [...]."

Track listing

Charts

Release history

References 

Gladys Knight albums
1978 debut albums
Buddah Records albums